Urban Search and Rescue Florida Task Force 1 (FL-TF1) is a FEMA Urban Search and Rescue Task Force based in Miami-Dade County, Florida and sponsored by the Miami-Dade Fire Rescue Department. The mission of FL-TF1 is to respond to natural and man-made disasters to provide search and rescue as well as both medical and communications support.

As with all FEMA Task Forces, FL-TF1 is trained in physical search and rescue in damaged or collapsed structures as well as in areas that have sustained significant flooding. Additionally the task force specializes in providing medical care at the scene of a disaster for trapped victims. FL-TF1 is also specifically trained in satellite communication systems that can be used in areas where normal communication infrastructure has been damaged.

Once notified by the Federal Emergency Management Agency (FEMA), the team has a six-hour window to mobilize 70 team members to report to a prearranged departure point.  FL-TF1 is composed mostly of personnel from the Miami-Dade Fire Rescue Department but other outside specialists are brought in as needed.  In addition, FL-TF1 has nine FEMA certified canine teams, each composed of a handler and a search dog.

History 
In the early 1980s two fire departments, Miami-Dade Fire Rescue and the Fairfax County Fire and Rescue Department out of Fairfax County, Virginia worked together under an agreement with the Office of Foreign Disaster Assistance to provide international search and rescue assistance in times of disaster. Starting in 1991, FEMA incorporated a USAR team into its federal response plan. These 20+ teams that would later become the FEMA Urban Search and Rescue Task Forces were chosen throughout the country based on geographic location with local public safety departments as sponsoring agencies.

Deployments 
Since its creation in the 1980s, FL-TF1 has responded to a wide range of disasters around the world.

Earthquakes 
 1985 Mexico City earthquake (Mexico City)
 1986 San Salvador earthquake (El Salvador)
 1988 Armenian earthquake (Armenia)
 1990 Luzon earthquake (Philippines)
 1997 Cariaco earthquake (Venezuela)
 1999 Armenia, Colombia earthquake (Colombia)
 1999 İzmit earthquake (Turkey)
 1999 Jiji earthquake (Taiwan)
 2010 Haiti earthquake (Haiti)

Weather disasters

Building explosions 
 1995 - Oklahoma City bombing
 1996 - Colombo, Sri Lanka
 1996 - Puerto Rico
 2001 - Pentagon
 2001 - World Trade Center

Airplane crashes 
1995-96 - American Airlines Flight 965 - Buga, Colombia
 1996 - ValuJet Flight 592 - Everglades, Florida

Communications support 
1989 - Romania
1991 - Northern Iraq & Turkey
1994 - Rwanda
1994 - Haiti
1995 - Montserrat
1995 - Sierra Leone
1996 - Bosnia
1998 - Nairobi, Kenya

Building collapse 
 2007 - Barbados
 2021 - Miami

References

Florida 1
Miami-Dade County, Florida